Stefanie Becker (born 5 April 1982) is a German former footballer who played as a defender. She made three appearances for the Germany national team in 2001.

References

External links
 

1982 births
Living people
German women's footballers
Women's association football defenders
Germany women's international footballers
Place of birth missing (living people)
People from Fulda
Sportspeople from Kassel (region)
Footballers from Hesse